Gregg v Scott [2005] UKHL 2 is an English tort law case, on the issue of loss of a chance, in causation. It affirms the principle of Hotson v East Berkshire Area Health Authority, on a narrow margin of 3 to 2.  Lord Nicholls' dissent is of particular note, in arguing that loss of a chance should be actionable.

Facts
The defendant, Dr Scott, negligently misdiagnosed the plaintiff's malignant cancer, (non-Hodgkin Lymphoma) stating it to be a benign collection of fatty tissue and thus no further treatment was needed. This had the effect of delaying Mr Gregg's treatment by nine months, reducing his chances of surviving ten years from 42% to 25%.

Under the earlier decision of Hotson v East Berkshire Area Health Authority, the view taken at first instance, and by the Court of Appeal, the claimant could not establish the defendant had prevented him being cured, as his original chance of a cure was below 50%. The plaintiff argued that he was entitled to recover for the loss of the 17% chance the defendant had deprived him of. The issue was whether the claimant could claim for their 'loss of a chance'.

Judgment

The Majority 
On appeal to the Lords, the majority upheld the earlier decision of Hotson. Damages were not recoverable because Mr Gregg failed to prove on the balance of probabilities that Dr Scott's negligence resulted in the loss of a chance of recovery. Had the doctor properly diagnosed Mr Gregg at the time, he would still have had a less than 50% chance of surviving (42%).

Lord Hoffman notes in his judgment that 'reduction in the prospect of a favourable outcome'  had been accepted in previous cases (Chaplin v Hicks [1911]), what was in doubt was whether loss of a chance can be applicable in cases involving clinical negligence.  
 
The majority judges also shared the view that imposing liability on the defendants in this case would result in a significant change in the law, hence, should be left to Parliament to decide whether or not changes should be made. Although Lord Hoffman noted cases in other jurisdictions that gave effect to loss of a chance claims where the plaintiff was unable to meet the factual causation standards of liability, such as in the Irish case of Philp v Ryan, he concluded that these were contrary to overriding UK authorities that would be inappropriate to 'abandon:'

Further, while Lord Hoffman also recognises academic criticism  of applying causation in this manner, expanding the exception in Fairchild would be too 'radical:'

Dissenting 

However, Lord Nicholls (joined by Lord Hope) dissented in arguing that loss of a chance should be actionable:

See also
 Hotson v East Berkshire Area Health Authority
 Negligence
Full judgment is available here

Notes

English tort case law
English causation case law
2005 in case law
2005 in British law
House of Lords cases